Alesci is a surname.  Notable people with the surname include:

 Cristina Alesci, American journalist
 Frank Alesci (born 1986), American soccer player

See also
 Alessi (surname)